Donde duermen dos... duermen tres is a 1979 Argentine comedy film directed by Enrique Cahen Salaberry. This film was distributed by an Argentine distributor named "Paris Video Home", a company that distributes comedy films.

Cast
Juan Carlos Calabró
Juan Buryúa Rey
Alberto Busaid
Berugo Carambula
Elina Colomer
Luis Corradi
Juan Carlos Dual
Cacho Espíndola
Susana Gimenez
Adela Gleijer
Zulma Grey
Norma López Monet
Susana Monetti
Tatave Moulin
Edelma Rosso
Renee Roxana
Vicente Rubino
Tristán
Isidro Fernán Valdez
Sergio Velazco Ferrero

External links
 

1979 films
Argentine comedy films
1970s Spanish-language films
1979 comedy films
Films directed by Enrique Cahen Salaberry
1970s Argentine films